Sunday Adelaja (Russian, Belarusian and Ukrainian: Сандей Аделаджа) is the founder and senior pastor of the Embassy of the Blessed Kingdom of God for All Nations, an evangelical-charismatic megachurch and a Christian denomination in Kyiv, Ukraine.

Biography
Sunday Sunkanmi Adelaja was born in the village of Idomila Ijebu-Ode, Nigeria. His name Adelaja means "crown settled this fight" in Yoruba. He was raised by his grandmother and became Christian in March 1986 just before graduating from high school.

In 1986, after graduation, Adelaja left Nigeria because he received a scholarship to study journalism at the Belarusian State University in Minsk, Byelorussian SSR.

After graduation and the breakdown of the USSR, he moved from Belarus to Ukraine in December 1993.

He claims he was threatened there by authorities for having a picture of Jesus in his house, but nevertheless, he began Christian activities in Belarus during his studies. He married and took a job in Kyiv.

Ministry
In 1993, 7 people and he founded the "Embassy of the Blessed Kingdom of God for All Nations" in his apartment. The church was officially founded in 1994 as the "World of Faith Bible Church".

In 2013, the church claimed 25,000 members in Kyiv, 100,000 members in Ukraine, and 1,000 churches in the rest of the world.

Thousands of people are fed daily in the church's soup kitchens in Kyiv. The church also has a program helping homeless people acquire skills, thus helping them back to a normal life and work. According to the church, 2,000 children have been helped off the street and have been returned to their families. Furthermore, the church runs a 24-hour hotline, named "Trust line" for people in need to call for help. The church also works with addicted people and has a program helping them to be set free from their various addictions. The main organization is called "Love Rehabilitation Center.” According to the church, more than 5000 drug and alcohol addicted people have been set free from their addictions through the church's work.

The New York Times made the following statement about Adelaja: "Could there be a more unlikely success story in the former Soviet Union than the Rev. Sunday Adelaja, an immigrant from Nigeria who has developed an ardent — and enormous — following across Ukraine?"

He founded many educational institutions connected to the church, and among them the following are more known: the Joshua Missionary Bible Institute in Ukraine, the Center of Restoration of Personality and Transformation of the Society in Ukraine, the History Makers Bible School in the US, the UK, Germany, France, and the Institute for National Transformation in Nigeria.

Role in Orange Revolution
The church has been credited with playing an active role in the popular gatherings that eventually led to the Orange Revolution. Sunday Adelaja has, however, denounced in Ukrainian media his implied initiation of the Orange Revolution. The mayor of Kyiv, Leonid Chernovetsky, is a member of the Embassy of God, but he is in opposition to the principal actors of the Orange Revolution, including Premier Yulia Tymoshenko. President Viktor Yushchenko has provided Adelaja with a certificate of thankfulness for his support in the Orange Revolution. During the protests, the church erected a tent chapel on Independence Square and offered shelter to thousands of people who came to Kyiv.

Awards and honors
In October 2010, Sunday Adelaja was one of the foreigners in Ukraine who were awarded The Most Influential Expats 2010 by the Kyiv Post newspaper.

In May 2009, Sunday Adelaja became The Face of Kyiv 2009. The annual competition was conducted by the magazine Afisha and Adelaja took the first place with more than 1/3 of the votes, beating to the second position, the most popular actor in Ukraine, Bohdan Stupka; to the third place, the Heavy weight boxer Vitali Klitschko; to the fourth place, one of the richest Entrepreneurs in Ukraine, Viktor Pinchuk; and to the fifth place the Mayor of Kyiv, Leonid Chernovetskyi.

At the Azusa Street Revival Festival on Saturday April 25, 2009, Sunday Adelaja received the first International William J. Seymour Award. This award is given to ministers who exhibit the characteristics of William J. Seymour. A statement from the award committee said: "This year we will award an international and national recipient: The international recipient will be Pastor Sunday Adelaja who is a Nigerian-born leader with an apostolic gift for the 21st century. In his mid-thirties Pastor Sunday has already proven to be one of the world's most dynamic communicators and church planters and is regarded as the most successful pastor in Europe with over 25,000 members as well as daughter and satellite churches in over 35 countries worldwide".

In March 2008 the Archbishop Benson Idahosa Prize for Missionary Exploits was presented to Rev. Sunday Adelaja in recognition of his missionary exploits and social engagement in Kyiv, Ukraine and around the world.

In March 2007 Sunday Adelaja became an Honorable Member of the Euroasian International Chamber of Commerce.

In May 2004 The Redeemed Christian Church of God (RCCG) Holland Mission gave a Special Appreciation to Pastor Sunday Adelaja for being part of what God is using His church to do in reaching out to the people of the Netherlands.

Pastor Sunday was honored to be on a first page article of the Wall Street Journal on July 21, 2006.

Pastor Sunday was honored to open the U.S. Senate in prayer on April 23, 2007.

Pastor Sunday was honored to speak twice at the United Nations on August 23, 2007.

Accusations
Adelaja was accused in November 2008 of being involved in the dealings of King's Capital, a financial group led by a former member of his congregation. The company promises as much as 60 percent returns on investments and drew many of its investors from the church. Later several former church members went to the authorities saying they were unable to recover the money they invested, which left many of them bankrupt. Police later arrested one of King's Capital leaders, Aleksandr Bandurchenko, on suspicion of fraud.

On February 5, 2009, a criminal case against Sunday Adelaja was filed on acclaim and suspicion of fraud. Investigators say they have testimony indicating that Adelaja was involved in the financial machinations allegedly committed by the King's Capital financial group. Kyiv's Mayor Chernovetsky, himself a church member, had earlier said that Adelaja was not involved in the financial scheme at King's Capital.

In September 2009, the Ministry of Internal Affairs of Ukraine admitted that they have exhausted their possibilities in the criminal case against Sunday Adelaja. Since the Ministry of Internal Affairs has still delayed and refused to take the case to the court the Embassy of God church and Sunday Adelaja has initiated a lawsuit against the Ministry of Internal Affairs and the Police of Ukraine for unlawful accusation and libel. The judge has asked the Ministry of Internal Affairs to show their evidence for their accusation of fraud, but after five court hearings, they have still not provided any evidence to support their accusation.

On October 12, 2009, Kyiv investigators questioned Adelaja in connection with the fraud accusation. During a press conference On October 14, 2009, the Minister of Internal Affairs Yuriy Lutsenko said that the pre-trial proceedings had found out that from October 2006 to May 2008, Adelaja and others embezzled property of people most of whom were the believers of the Embassy of God church. The total amount of the damage due to these actions is over UAH 1.5 million in accordance with evidence provided by several witnesses, according to the Minister.

Adelaja considers the police's decision to investigate him for involvement in the financial group's machinations as an implementation of political order. And has said that the cause of the financial problems at the King's Capital financial group was the economic crisis rather than deliberate fraud.

As of April 2011, the case has not been taken to court.

Criticisms
On 28 December 2008, nine leaders of evangelical churches in Ukraine signed a statement in which they, among other things, dissociate themselves from Sunday Adelaja and his activity.  They accuse him of trying to create a cult of personality, and accuse him of using methods and activity based on self-advertisement, exaggeration of personal merits, teaching the doctrine of prosperity and the sin of love of money, and his practice of cursing the church members and parishioners who disagree with his opinion.

Besides Embassy of God Church there are two other megachurches in Ukraine; Victory Church and Hillsong Church, and their pastors, Henry Madava and Evgenij Kasevich have not signed the statement.

Political views
Adelaja supports Ukrainian nationalism, according to him Ukraine can only become independent through a nationalist mood. He considers it unfortunate that patriotism does not apply to all Ukrainians. "Only through the nationalistic mood can the Ukrainian nation become independent at all. If Ukrainians do not become more nationalistic, I am afraid that this country may come back under the Russian or Polish or Hungarian or some other yoke".

Adelaja thinks racism is not typical of the Ukrainian society. "I think it is a more Russian phenomenon, which came here. But Russia also sees how bad racism is for a country's reputation".

Adelaja was a strong supporter of the Orange Revolution. "Twelve years ago we were freed from Communism. Though we have had a different government with different uniforms since, the same corrupt people have remained in power. Now, Ukraine has its first opportunity to choose our own free way of life." He stated about the then candidate in and later winner of the 2004 Ukrainian presidential election Viktor Yushchenko: "He is a committed believer who is serious about his faith, and is influenced by God and the Bible".
However, during the 2010 president elections Adelaja decided and called all affiliated churches to vote for Victor Yanukovich, the opponent of the "Orange" leaders (Tymoshenko and Yushchenko).

Bibliography
Sunday Adelaja has written many books in various languages.
Life Is An Opportunity, 2017
Money won’t make you Rich, 2016
The Kingdom Driven Life: Thy Kingdom Come Thy will be Done on Earth..., 2015
Time is Life: History Makers Honor Time, 2012
Accessing Divine Wisdom, 2008
ChurchShift, 2008
ChurchShift Guide, 2008
Understanding God, 2007
The road to greatness, 2006
The Jesus you never knew, 2006
Successful marriage takes work, 2005
Life and death in the power of the tongue, 2005
The man God will use, 2005
Pastoring without tears, 2005
Living sexually free, 2005
You and your pastor, 2003
 How to keep your focus, 2015
 Money Wont make You Rich, 2009
 Myles Munroe - Finding Answers To Why Good People Die Tragic and Early Deaths, 2016
 Nigeria And The Leadership Question, 2016
 Only God Can Save Nigeria, 2016
 The Kingdom Driven Life, 2016
 Who Am I, 2016
 7 Tips To Self-fulfilment In Life, 2017
 A Visionless Life Is A Meaningless Life, 2017
 Could You Be The Abraham Of Your Nation, 2017
 Create Your Own Net Worth, 2017
 Discover The Source Of Your Latent Energy, 2017
 Discovering The Purpose And Calling Of Nations, 2017
 DON’T EAT TOMORROW’S FOOD TODAY, 2017
 Excellence Your Key To Elevation, 2017
 Hello! I Am Searching For Problems, 2017
 How Africans Brought Civilization To Europe, 2017
 How The Nigerian Economy Can Overtake The American Economy, 2017
 How To Be In The Here And Now, 2017
 How To Become A Developed Nation Through The Dignity Of Labor, 2017
 How To Become Great Through Time Conversion, 2017
 How To Build A Secured Financial Future, 2017
 How to form core values in a child, 2017
 How To Get What You Need In Life, 2017
 How To Live An Effective Life, 2017
 How To Make Nigeria The Greatest Country In The World, 2017
 How To Overcome The Fear Of Death, 2017
 How To Regain Your Lost Years, 2017
 How To Transform And Build a Civilized Nation, 2017
 How To Win In Life, 2017
 I Am A Person. Am I A Personality?, 2017
 Insulted by Ungodliness, 2017
 Life Is An Opportunity, 2017
 Mountain of Ignorance, 2017
 No One Is Better Than You, 2017
 Pastor, Face Your Calling, 2017
 Poverty Mindset Vs Abundance Mindset, 2017
 Problems Your Shortcut To Prominence, 2017
 Raising The Next Generation Of Steve Jobs And Bill Gates, 2017
 Stop Working For Uncle Sam, 2017
 The Creative And Innovative Power Of A Genius, 2017
 The Danger Of Monoculturalism, 2017
 The Essence And Value Of Life, 2017
 The Law of Difference, 2017
 The Nigerian Economy. The Way Forward, 2017
 The Veritable Source Of Energy, 2017
 What Do You Do With Your Time, 2017
 Where are the heroes? Let heroes Аrise!, 2017
 Where There Is Problem There Is Money, 2017
 Why Losing Your Job Is The Best Thing That Could Happen To You, 2017
 Why You Must Urgently Become A Workaholic, 2017
 Work Is Better Than Vacation, Labour Better Than Favour, 2017
 Your greatness is proportional to your trials, crises and tribulations!, 2017
 The power and force of discipline for transforming lives and nations, 2017
 RID YOURSELF OF SHALOWMIDEDNESS, CREATE SOLUTIONS FOR YOUR WORLD, 2018
 WHEN TO PRAY, WHEN NOT TO PRAY AND WHEN TO STOP PRAYING, 2018
 Why am I unlucky?, 2018
 Teambuilding skills of Jesus, 2018
 STOP BLAMING WHAT YOU LACK, 2018
 YOUR TOMORROW DEPENDS ON THE ACTIONS YOU TAKE TODAY, 2018
 The role of elites in national transformation, 2018
 The sin of irresponsibility, 2018
 HOW TO TURN NEGATIVE ENERGY INTO POSITIVE ENERGY, 2018
 FALSE AND TRUE UNDERSTANDING OF LOVE, 2018
 HOW TO TRANSFORM A NATION THROUGH THE POWER OF FAITH, 2018
 You are born to make your nation great, 2018

See also
 Embassy of God

References

External links
 Official website of Pastor Sunday Adelaja
 The Official Facebook page of Pastor Sunday Adelaja
 The Official Blog of Pastor Sunday Adelaja

Living people
Ukrainian clergy
Nigerian evangelicals
Nigerian emigrants to the Soviet Union
Nigerian expatriates in Belarus
Nigerian emigrants to Ukraine
Naturalized citizens of Ukraine
Ukrainian nationalists
1967 births
Belarusian State University alumni
Yoruba Christian clergy
Ukrainian people of Nigerian descent
Ukrainian people of Yoruba descent
People from Ijebu Ode
Ukrainian Pentecostals
Prosperity theologians
Nigerian Pentecostal pastors